Kallangur was an electoral district of the Legislative Assembly in the Australian state of Queensland from 1992 to 2017.

The district was based in the outer northern suburbs of Brisbane. It is named for the suburb of Kallangur and also includes the suburbs of Dakabin, Kurwongbah, Murrumba Downs, Petrie and part of Narangba. The electorate was first contested in 1992.

Members for Kallangur

Election results

References

External links
 

Former electoral districts of Queensland
Constituencies established in 1992
Constituencies disestablished in 2017
2017 disestablishments in Australia
1992 establishments in Australia